Bernd Metz (*1979 in Landau) is a German artist and curator. 
He works and lives in Frankfurt am Main, Germany.

Bernd Metz studied Art and Cultural Studies at the Goethe University in Frankfurt, Germany from 2004 to 2010 and art and philosophy at the  Universitat Autònoma de Barcelona, Spain in 2008. He graduated as Magister Artium and is an alumnus of the German National Academic Foundation.

He is one of the founders of the artist group spezialLabor, co-founder and co-director of the toll ffm – galerie für zeitgenössische kunst in Frankfurt. In 2012 he was a lecturer, pdh-candidate and research assistant for Visual Culture Studies at the Goethe University in Frankfurt. He is working as a freelance curator and art mediator for several institutions.

In 2014, he was resident artist at the art studio of the National Museum of Modern and Contemporary Art, Seoul, South Korea and in Vienna, Austria for the Kulturamt Frankfurt am Main. His works have been displayed in various exhibitions in Germany and abroad (USA, the Netherlands, Turkey, South Korea and Uruguay). He is represented at the Galerie HanfWeihnacht, in Frankfurt, Germany.

Since 2016, he is working on an alternative art project called SHRTLST with the focus on Visual Culture and new contemporary artistic approaches. SHRTLST includes a poster edition of a short selection of international artists which will be presented in various cities.

References 

 Künstlerhaus Schloss Balmoral: Stipendiaten 2014
 Kultur-frankfurt.de: toll ffm - galerie für zeitgenössische kunst
 Museum of Modern and Contemporary Art, Seoul, South Korea: Artist-In-Residence Programm 2014
 Article in Faust Kultur Magazine: Everything In Its Right Place, 2014
 Artfacts.com: Bernd Metz

External links 
 artist's website
 spezialLabor
 toll – galerie für zeitgenössische kunst 
 Galerie hanfweihnacht, Frankfurt
 SHRTLST EDITION

Artists from Frankfurt
Living people
1979 births
German contemporary artists
German conceptual artists
German art curators
Goethe University Frankfurt alumni
Autonomous University of Barcelona alumni
People from Landau